After the release of the band's tenth album Fleetwood Mac in July 1975, the band, along with their new line-up of Lindsey Buckingham on guitar and vocals and Stevie Nicks on vocals, set off on a tour of the US and Canada to promote the album.

Set list

1975 setlist 
 Get Like You Used to Be (Chicken Shack cover)
 Station Man
 Spare Me a Little of Your Love
 Rhiannon
 Monday Morning
 Why
 Landslide
 Crystal (Buckingham Nicks cover)
 Frozen Love (Buckingham Nicks cover)
 Over My Head
 Say You Love Me
 I'm So Afraid
 Oh Well
 The Green Manalishi (with the Two Pronged Crown) 
 World Turning
 Blue Letter
Encore:
 Don't Let Me Down Again (Buckingham Nicks cover)
 Hypnotized

1976 setlist 
 Sunny Side of Heaven
 Spare Me a Little of Your Love
 Rhiannon
 Monday Morning
 Why 
 Landslide
 Over My Head
 Say You Love Me
 Silver Springs
 You Make Loving Fun
 I'm So Afraid
 Oh Well
 World Turning
 Blue Letter
Encore:
 Don't Let Me Down Again (Buckingham Nicks cover)
 Hypnotized

Tour dates

Box office score data

Notes

Personnel 
Mick Fleetwood – drums, congas, cowbell, gong, talking drum
John McVie – bass guitar
Christine McVie – hammond B3-organ, piano, solina string ensemble, hohner pianet, maracas, vocals
Lindsey Buckingham – acoustic & electric guitars, vocals
Stevie Nicks – vocals, tambourine

References

1975 concert tours
Fleetwood Mac concert tours